Camelopsocus similis is a species of common barklouse in the family Psocidae. It is found in Central America and North America.

References

Psocidae
Articles created by Qbugbot
Insects described in 1965